I'm Your Man is a 1992 short film which was created to showcase Loews Theatres' interactive cinema technology. Audiences used seat-mounted joysticks to vote between three options in action at six different points throughout the movie.

Production
The movie was designed as the first test of Interfilm, Bob Bejan's interactive cinema company. The film was shot on 16mm Kodak film, transferred to LaserDisc, and digitally projected to allow for nearly seamless transitions when audiences made their choices. Acting and direction were less than impressive; the movie was shot over only 6 days, and Bejan did not require a second take of any shot.

In very early roles for both of them, comedy actors Michael Ian Black and Ben Garant appear as background in a party scene.

Distribution
The film premiered in a special theater at the Loews on 19th Street and Broadway in New York City in December 1992. Tickets to the 20-minute show were $3, and ticket holders were allowed to stay for as many viewings as they wanted. Retrofitting an existing theater with the necessary voting equipment cost approximately $70,000, and 42 other theaters made the investment in 1993 and 1994. The film—and the interactivity itself—were well received by teens but dismissed by critics and adult moviegoers as being "as gimmicky as three-dimensional glasses or scratch 'n' sniff" and "not like watching a real movie... more like rooting for a basketball team." A common criticism was that moviegoers would use the controls at vacant seats to vote more than once. Another concern was that the act of voting took moviegoers out of the story; it was thought that real-time interaction hampered the viewing experience, and engineers began working on an alternative technology that would let users customize movies before viewing began.

Although the format ultimately failed due to lack of marketing and poor audience reception, I'm Your Man was released on DVD on August 18, 1998 as part of a second attempt at interactive video.

See also
Mr. Payback: An Interactive Movie
Night Trap
Black Mirror: Bandersnatch

References

External links

1992 films
Interactive films
Loews Cineplex Entertainment
1990s English-language films